Oscar Mason (born 25 May 1975 in Varese) is a former Italian racing cyclist.

Palmares

1996
3rd Girobio
3rd Triptyque Ardennais
1997
 National Road Race Champion
1st Girobio
1st Gran Premio Palio del Recioto
1st stages 1 and 4 Triptyque Ardennais
2000
3rd Trofeo Melinda
9th Tour de Suisse
2003
1st Giro d'Abruzzo
3rd Coppa Agostoni
6th La Flèche Wallonne

References

1975 births
Living people
Italian male cyclists
Cyclists from Varese